Ellery Cory Stowell (December 12, 1875 - January 1, 1958)  was a professor of international law at Columbia University and then American University in Washington, D.C. He represented the United States at The Hague Convention of 1907 and the London Naval Conference (1908–1909).

Biography
Stowell was born on December 12, 1875, in Lynn, Massachusetts. He was a professor of international law at Columbia University and then American University in Washington, D.C. He moved to California when he retired. He died on January 1, 1958, in Berkeley, California.

Legacy
Stowell's papers are stored at Stanford University.

References

1875 births
1958 deaths
American educators
People from Massachusetts